GREET (Greenhouse gases, Regulated Emissions, and Energy use in Technologies) is a full life-cycle model sponsored by the Argonne National Laboratory (U.S. Department of Energy's Office of Energy Efficiency and Renewable Energy). It fully evaluates energy and emission impacts of advanced and new transportation fuels, the fuel cycle from well to wheel and the vehicle cycle through material recovery and vehicle disposal. It allows researchers and analysts to evaluate various vehicle and fuel combinations on a full fuel-cycle/vehicle-cycle basis.

The GREET model is specified in the Inflation Reduction Act of 2022 §45V as the methodology to calculate the lifecycle greenhouse gas emissions "through the point of production (well-to-gate)" when determining the level of tax credit for clean Hydrogen production until a successor is approved by the Secretary of the Treasury.

The basic implementation of the model was made using Excel spreadsheets. However a more practical and easy to use software developed with .NET and with a fully graphical toolbox is also available.

Content 
For a given vehicle and fuel system, GREET separately calculates the following:

Consumption of total energy (energy in non-renewable and renewable sources), fossil fuels (petroleum, fossil natural gas, and coal together), petroleum, coal and natural gas;
Emissions of CO2-equivalent greenhouse gases - primarily carbon dioxide (CO2), methane (CH4), and nitrous oxide (N2O); and
Emissions of six criteria pollutants: volatile organic compounds (VOCs), carbon monoxide (CO), nitrogen oxide (NOx), airborne particulate matter with sizes smaller than 10 micrometre (PM10]), particulate matter with sizes smaller than 2.5 micrometre (PM2.5), and sulfur oxides (SOx).

GREET includes more than 100 fuel production pathways and more than 70 vehicle/fuel systems.

Michael Wang, a Senior Scientist in the Energy Systems Division is the primary developer of GREET.

External links
 http://greet.es.anl.gov/

References

Vehicle emission controls
Emission standards
Transport and the environment
Standards of the United States